The Airborne Avenger is an American ultralight aircraft that was designed and produced by Airborne Wing Design in the early 1980s. The aircraft was supplied as a kit for amateur construction.

Design and development
It has a strut-braced high-wing, single-seat, open cockpit, single pusher engine configuration, and is equipped with tricycle landing gear using nosewheel steering.

The aircraft is made from bolted-together aluminium tubing, with the wings and tail covered in Dacron sailcloth. The fuselage consists of a single aluminium keel tube that runs from the tail surfaces to the nose wheel. The cockpit is an open seat bolted to the main keel tube. Its  span wing has an 80% double surface and features half-span ailerons. The wing is supported by dual parallel lift struts with jury struts. The tricycle landing gear has pneumatic shock suspension and the nosewheel is steerable. There is also a small tail caster as the aircraft sits on its tail with no occupant in the pilot's seat. The landing gear has notably high ground clearance for rough field operations and the engine, mounted on the wing trailing edge, drives a propeller that is protected by the low-mounted tailboom.

Available as either a kit for home construction or as a complete aircraft, the Avenger was introduced in the early 1980s when the market was becoming saturated with ultralight designs; as a result, the company quickly went out of business and production ended.

Specifications

References

External links
 Airborne Avenger at the Virtual Ultralight Museum archives

1980s United States ultralight aircraft
Homebuilt aircraft